Roberta Vinci was the defending champion, but lost in the final to Francesca Schiavone, 6–1, 6–1.

Seeds

Draw

Finals

Top half

Bottom half

External links
Draw and Qualifying Draw

Singles